Brittany Tran (born March 8, 1993, in Red Deer, Alberta) is a Canadian curler from Calgary. She currently plays third on Team Kayla Skrlik.

Career

Juniors
As a junior, Tran played third for Team Jocelyn Peterman, playing with her since 2003. They represented Alberta at the 2011 Canada Winter Games, where they won a silver medal. In 2012, the team won the Alberta junior championships and represented Alberta at the 2012 Canadian Junior Curling Championships, which they won. They represented Canada at the 2012 World Junior Curling Championships, losing in a tiebreaker.

The next season, the team played in the 2012 Curlers Corner Autumn Gold Curling Classic, their first women's Grand Slam event, where they won just one game. The team could not defend their Canadian Junior title, as they lost in a tiebreaker in the 2013 Alberta junior championship. The team remained together for their final junior season in 2013–14. They played in the 2013 Curlers Corner Autumn Gold Curling Classic, losing all of their games. Later in the year, they lost to Team Kelsey Rocque in the Alberta junior championship.

Women's
In 2014, the Peterman rink went their separate ways when their junior careers ended. Tran joined up Team Casey Scheidegger, playing lead for the team for the 2014–15 season. On the World Curling Tour, they would win the Medicine Hat Charity Classic, and went 3–3 at the 2014 Curlers Corner Autumn Gold Curling Classic. Later in the year they played in the 2015 Alberta Scotties Tournament of Hearts, Tran's first women's provincial championship. There, the team finished fourth, losing in the page 3 vs. 4 game to Chelsea Carey.

In 2015, Tran joined the Geri-Lynn Ramsay rink, initially playing third for the team, but being moved to second between 2016 and 2018. The team played in the 2017 and 2018 Alberta Scotties Tournament of Hearts, losing in the page 3 vs. 4 game in 2017 (against Scheidegger) and failing to make the playoffs in 2018.  

In 2018, the Ramsay rink split up, and Tran joined Team Kerry Galusha out of the Northwest Territories. The team won the Royal LePage Women's Fall Classic tour event that season, and easily won the 2019 Northwest Territories Scotties Tournament of Hearts. Representing the Northwest Territories, Team Galusha finished the preliminary round of the 2019 Scotties Tournament of Hearts, Canada's national women's curling championship with a 3–4 record. After just one season, Tran moved back to Alberta and joined the Kayla Skrlik rink at second. The team won two events on the tour, the Medicine Hat Charity Classic and The Good Times Bonspiel. They also represented Canada at the 2019 Changan Ford International Curling Elite, finishing with a 2–5 record. At the 2020 Alberta Scotties Tournament of Hearts, Team Skrlik finished in fifth place with a 2–5 record.

Due to the COVID-19 pandemic in Canada, many provinces had to cancel their provincial championships, with member associations selecting their representatives for the 2021 Scotties Tournament of Hearts. Due to this situation, Curling Canada added three Wild Card teams to the national championship, which were based on the CTRS standings from the 2019–20 season. Team Beth Peterson qualified for the Scotties as the third Wild Card team, however their lead Melissa Gordon opted to not attend the Scotties due to work commitments. Tran replaced Gordon at the Scotties after getting a call from Team Peterson's alternate and coach Cathy Overton-Clapham to join the team. At the Tournament of Hearts, they finished with a respectable 7–5 fifth place finish.

Mixed doubles
In 2020, Tran and her mixed doubles partner Aaron Sluchinski won the 2020 Alberta Mixed Doubles Curling Championship, however did not get to compete in the 2020 Canadian Mixed Doubles Curling Championship as it was cancelled due to the COVID-19 pandemic in Canada. As the 2021 Alberta provincial playdowns were cancelled due to the COVID-19 pandemic in Alberta, Tran and Sluchinski were selected to represent Alberta at the 2021 Canadian Mixed Doubles Curling Championship in Calgary. At the championship, the pair finished the round robin with a 4–2 record, qualifying for the championship round as the eleventh seed. They then faced eventual champions Kerri Einarson and Brad Gushue in the round of 12 where they lost 9–8, eliminating them from contention.

Personal life
Tran is employed as a corporate environmental specialist with the City of Calgary. She grew up in Red Deer and started curling when she was six. She is of half-Vietnamese descent.

References

External links

Living people
Canadian women curlers
1993 births
Curlers from Calgary
Sportspeople from Red Deer, Alberta
Canadian people of Vietnamese descent
Canadian sportspeople of Vietnamese descent